Qingjiang may refer to:

 Qing River, a tributary of the Yangtze in Hubei, China
 Huai'an, formerly Qingjiang, Jiangsu, China
 Zhangshu, formerly Qingjiang County, Jiangxi, China
 Qingjiang, Zixing (清江镇), a town of Zixing, Hunan
 Qingjiang biota, a Burgess Shale type preservation in China